John Brown (8 May 1937 – 8 July 2001) was an Australian rules footballer who played with Geelong in the Victorian Football League (VFL) during the 1960s.

Brown was recruited from Stawell were in 1959 won the club's best and fairest.

The following year he commenced with Geelong.

Brown was a wingman in Geelong's 1963 premiership team.

References

External links

1937 births
Australian rules footballers from Victoria (Australia)
Geelong Football Club players
Geelong Football Club Premiership players
Stawell Football Club players
2001 deaths
One-time VFL/AFL Premiership players